Mickey's Mouse Tracks is an American animated television series on The Disney Channel which ran from 1992 to 1995, and featured Disney cartoons and animated short films, dating from before the advent of The Disney Channel. A similar show was Donald's Quack Attack. The show premiered on November 2, 1992, along with Donald's Quack Attack, on The Disney Channel. The show was made to replace Good Morning, Mickey! A similar show called Mickey Mouse and Friends was produced between 1994 and 1995 and shown in Europe.

It was not possible to know what episode was going to be shown on any given day, but the show did feature some shorts that were not shown on The Ink and Paint Club along with some shorts made by the Fleischer brothers, and clips from Disney animated features such as Snow White and the Seven Dwarfs, Pinocchio, Dumbo, Cinderella, and Alice in Wonderland.

In between each cartoon, a short segment featured a small clip of a Mickey Mouse cartoon, accompanied by the Mouse Tracks logo. In 1999, the show was succeeded by Mickey Mouse Works, later given a plot as House of Mouse. In addition to airing on The Disney Channel from 1992 to 2000, the show also ran on Toon Disney from 1998 to 1999.

Broadcast history

United States
Disney Channel (November 2, 1992 – 2000)
Toon Disney (1998–1999)

Canada
Family (1994–1997)

United Kingdom
Disney Channel (1995–2000)
Toon Disney (2000–2003)

France
Disney Channel (1997–2002)
Toon Disney (2001–2003)

Italy
Rai Due (1993–present)
Disney Channel (1998–2000)
Toon Disney (2004–2011)

Russia
 Channel One (2006) 
 Disney Channel (2013)

References

External links
 Mickey's Mouse Tracks episode guide at The Encyclopedia of Disney Animated Shorts

1990s American animated television series
1990s American anthology television series
1992 American television series debuts
1995 American television series endings
American children's animated anthology television series
Disney Channel original programming
Disney animated television series
Mickey Mouse television series
Donald Duck television series